Kai Kovaljeff (born 8 August 1985 in Tampere) is a Finnish ski jumper.

He made his Continental Cup debut in September 2007, his best result being a seventh place from Villach in September 2007. He made his World Cup debut in January 2009 in Zakopane, and collected his first World Cup points with a 21st place in that race. At the end of the month in Sapporo he finished 16th. His next World Cup points came in the 2009–10 FIS Ski Jumping World Cup opener, with a 29th place in Kuusamo.

References

1985 births
Living people
Sportspeople from Tampere
Finnish male ski jumpers